O sebe is the second solo album by Russian pop star Polina Gagarina. It was released on 11 March 2010.

Critical reception 
Alexey Mazhaev from InterMedia gave the album three stars out of five, stating that whilst "Oy!" and "Vinovata ya" are some of the weaker tracks on the playlist, "Lyubov pod soltsem", "Gde-to zhivyot lyubov", "Tayu" and "Komu, zachem?" are definite hits. The Mirmadzhi website gave the album a mixed rating, singling out "Vinovata ya", "Polyushka", "Bez obid" and "Propadi vsyo propadom" as the best songs in the tracklist. The author of the article stated that the album is replete with songs, which hold humour, enthusiasm and fervour.

Tracklist

References 

2010 albums
Polina Gagarina albums